Rain Vessenberg (born 27 November 1975) is a retired football (soccer) goalkeeper from Estonia. He played for several clubs in his native country, including JK Nõmme United and JK Viljandi Tulevik.

International career
Vessenberg earned his first official cap for the Estonia national football team on 26 October 1994, when Estonia played Finland in a friendly match in the Kadrioru Stadium in Tallinn: 0:7. He obtained a total number of five  caps.

References

1975 births
Living people
Estonian footballers
Estonia international footballers
Association football goalkeepers
Viljandi JK Tulevik players
Estonian expatriate footballers
Expatriate footballers in Finland
Estonian expatriate sportspeople in Finland
FC Nõmme United players